Stanley Leonard Raiman (March 22, 1914 – January 30, 1997) was an American professional basketball player. He played for the Buffalo Bisons in the National Basketball League and averaged 2.4 points per game. He later coached high school basketball.

References

1914 births
1997 deaths
American men's basketball players
Basketball players from New York (state)
Buffalo Bisons (NBL) players
Canisius Golden Griffins men's basketball players
Forwards (basketball)
Guards (basketball)
High school basketball coaches in New York (state)
People from Lackawanna, New York